Minnesota State Highway 50 (MN 50) is a  highway in Minnesota, which runs from its intersection with State Highway 3 and Dakota County Road 74 in Farmington and continues east to its eastern terminus at its intersection with U.S. 61 and State Highway 20 near Miesville.

State Highway 50 passes through the communities of Farmington, Empire Township, Castle Rock Township, Hampton, Hampton Township, New Trier, and Douglas Township.

Route description
State Highway 50 serves as an east–west route between Farmington, Hampton, New Trier, and Miesville.

The route is located in Dakota County.

State Highway 50 is also known as:

220th Street between Farmington and Hampton
240th Street East between Hampton and Miesville
Hampton Boulevard in Hampton

State Highway 50 and adjoining County Road 74 are also known as Ash Street in the city of Farmington.

History
State Highway 50 was authorized in 1920 between Cannon Falls and Minneapolis. U.S. Highway 55 was routed along this highway in 1926. 55 was removed in 1934, and much of the road was replaced by U.S. Highways 52 and 65.

The route was paved between Hampton and Farmington as early as 1929.

In 1949, State Highway 50 was extended east of Hampton to U.S. 61 near Miesville along 240th Street East.

At one time, State Highway 50 had continued farther west. From 1957 to 1994, the route had continued west of Farmington on present day Dakota County Highway 50 between State Highway 3 in Farmington and Interstate 35 in Lakeville.  This section had also previously been part of old U.S. Highway 65 from 1934 to 1957.

The section of Highway 50 between Hampton and Miesville was paved by 1961.

Major intersections

References

050
Transportation in Dakota County, Minnesota
U.S. Route 52
U.S. Route 65
U.S. Route 55